Robert Sadowski (16 August 1914, in Chernivtsi, then Czernowitz, Austria-Hungary – ?) was a Romanian international footballer with Polish roots, who played for AMEF Arad, Juventus București, Rapid București, Ciocanul București and abroad for AS Monaco. He earned 5 caps for Romania national team, and participated at the 1938 FIFA World Cup in a match against Cuba.

Honours
Rapid Bucharest
Cupa României (3): 1939–40, 1940–41, 1941–42

References

External links
 
 

1914 births
Year of death missing
Place of death missing
Sportspeople from Chernivtsi
People from the Duchy of Bukovina
Romanian footballers
Romanian people of Polish descent
Romania international footballers
Romanian expatriate footballers
FC Rapid București players
FC Petrolul Ploiești players
AS Monaco FC players
Expatriate footballers in Monaco
Romanian expatriate sportspeople in Monaco
1938 FIFA World Cup players
Liga I players
Ligue 2 players
Association football goalkeepers